Cominsky is the Americanized form of Polish Komiński. Notable people with the name include:
 Jim Cominsky (1918–2003), American professional basketball player
 John Cominsky (born 1995), American football defensive end
 Lynn Cominsky, American astrophysicist and educator

References 

Americanized surnames
Polish toponymic surnames